The Redmi 8 is an Android-based smartphone as part of the Redmi series, a sub-brand of Xiaomi Inc. It was announced on October 9, 2019 and it was released on October 12, 2019.

References 

Android (operating system) devices
8
Mobile phones with multiple rear cameras
Mobile phones with infrared transmitter
Mobile phones introduced in 2019
Discontinued smartphones